Turkeyfoot Run is a  long 1st order tributary to Kings Creek in Hancock County, West Virginia.

Course
Turkeyfoot Run rises about 1.5 miles north of Sun Valley, West Virginia, in Hancock County, West Virginia and then flows south to join Kings Creek at Sun Valley.

Watershed
Turkeyfoot Run drains  of area, receives about 38.7 in/year of precipitation, has a wetness index of 336.30, and is about 60% forested.

See also
List of Rivers of West Virginia

References

Rivers of West Virginia
Rivers of Hancock County, West Virginia